Irina Berezhna ((ukr. transliteration) Iryna Hryhorivna Berezhna, (rus. transliteration) Irina Grygorievna Berezhnaya) (13 August 1980 – 5 August 2017) was a Ukrainian politician who represented the Party of Regions in the Verkhovna Rada, while serving as a People's Deputy from 2007 to 2014.

Career
She was born in 1980 in Voroshylovhrad (present-day Luhansk), Ukrainian SSR, USSR. 

In 2002, Irina Berezhna graduated from the Kyiv National Taras Shevchenko University, law faculty, majoring in jurisprudence. 

In 2009, she graduated from the National Academy for Public Administration under the President of Ukraine with a degree in public administration.

After training in her major, as provided by applicable law, in January 2004, she successfully passed the qualification exam, received a license for notarial activities, and worked as a trainee notary in Kyiv. 

During the training (2000-2002) Berezhna worked as an assistant-consultant of the Chairman of the Subcommittee on legislation, systematization of legislation and its conformity with international law, the Committee on Legal Policy of the Verkhovna Rada of Ukraine.

In 1999, she opened her first business, a travel agency. In 2004, she became the Deputy Director for Legal Affairs at LLC law firm Astra-Service. 

In 2008, her notary office received a professional award, "European quality" of European Business Association (Oxford, UK). Until November 2007 Irina Berezhna was a private notary in Kyiv city notarial district.

Scientific and Public Activities
In July 2007, Berezhna received her Ph.D. in law. She was also the author of several publications on law and notarial practice in the legal and business editions. She was a member of the Ukrainian Bar Association. She worked closely with the Association of Lawyers of Ukraine, the Chamber of Notaries, and the European Business Association. She was also known for her pro-Russian and Eurosceptic views.
She was an awardee of the all-Ukrainian prize "Woman of the 3rd Millennium".

Verkhovna Rada
In 2007 Berezhna became an MP from the Party of Regions (No. 151 on the electoral list)
 Chairman of the Subcommittee on rights, freedoms, and interests of citizens and systematizing, an adaptation of Ukraine's legislation to international legal standards in the field of justice and the status of judges of the Supreme Rada of Ukraine Committee on Justice
 Member of the Ukrainian part of the Committee on Parliamentary Cooperation between Ukraine and the European Union
 Head of the Group for interparliamentary relations with the Hashemite Kingdom of Jordan
 Member of the Group for Interparliamentary Relations with the Republic of Algeria
 Member of the Group for Interparliamentary Relations with the United States of America
 Member of the Group for Interparliamentary Relations with Poland
 Member of the Group for Interparliamentary Relations with Russia
 Member of the Group for Interparliamentary Relations with the Republic of Korea
 Member of the Group for Interparliamentary Relations with the United Kingdom of Great Britain and Northern Ireland
 Member of the Group for Interparliamentary Relations with the Federal Republic of Germany

In the 2012 parliamentary election, Berezhna representing the Party of Regions, won a constituency seat in Kharkiv Oblast with 41.82% of the votes.
 Member of the Committee of the Verkhovna Rada on issues of European integration
In the 2014 parliamentary election, Berezhna did not participate.

Personal life
Berezhna had a daughter Daniella, born in 2009. It is not officially known who the father of Daniella is; although Ukrainian media reports claim it is businessman Boris Fuksman.

Death and burial
Irina Berezhna died on 5 August 2017 in a car accident near the Adriatic coast of Croatia. 

The driver lost control, and the car went off the winding road. Her daughter survived. Ukrainian newspaper "Fakty" regarding Croatian portal zadarski.slobodnadalmacija.hr informed that the incident took place in the middle of the night at 01:30 on a highway between the Croatian port village Maslenica and a small settlement Posedarje along the bay Novigradsko more. Two others perished in the crash: a female of 37 and a 38-year-old male, a citizen of Bulgaria. 

A "Mercedes" with a Bulgarian license plate was driving towards Posedarje, but for unknown reasons, left the road and ran into a pole. As a result of the road incident, an 8-year-old child in the car was injured. The girl was taken to a hospital in the city of Zadar.

On 10 August 2017, in the Refectory Church of the Kiev Cave Monastery, a memorial service was held, which was attended by a number of politicians and celebrities, including parliamentary Dmytro, brother of Mykhailo Dobkin, Nestor Shufrych, Hanna Herman, Davyd Zhvania, Mykola Martynenko, Ihor Huzhva, Olha Freimut, Svetlana Loboda, and others. 

According to Strana.ua Daniella, a daughter of Berezhna, will be fostered by Boris Fuksman. Berezhna was buried the same day at Zvirynets Cemetery.

See also
 2007 Ukrainian parliamentary election
 Verkhovna Rada
Politics of Ukraine

References

External links
 Irina Berezhna profile at Verkhovna Rada of Ukraine official web-site 
 Irina Berezhna official webpage

1980 births
2017 deaths
21st-century Ukrainian women politicians
Party of Regions politicians
People from Luhansk
Ukrainian jurists
Road incident deaths in Croatia
Seventh convocation members of the Verkhovna Rada
Sixth convocation members of the Verkhovna Rada
Taras Shevchenko National University of Kyiv alumni
National Academy of State Administration alumni
Burials at Zvirynets Cemetery
Women members of the Verkhovna Rada